Aaron Schneekloth (born July 15, 1978) is a Canadian former professional ice hockey player and a current coach in the Colorado Avalanche system, as an assistant coach of their affiliate located in the American Hockey League.

He played most notably with the Colorado Eagles in the Central Hockey League and ECHL. He finished second in all-time games played for the Eagles with 382 and fifth in points with 356.

After the 2012–13 season, his twelfth as a professional, Schneekloth announced his retirement from his playing career to accept an assistant coaching role and remained with the Eagles on August 23, 2013. On July 18, 2016, he was promoted to head coach of the Eagles. The Eagles then won back-to-back Kelly Cup championships in 2017 and 2018 before the team was added to the American Hockey League (AHL) for 2018–19. When the Eagles joined the AHL, Schneekloth was retained as an assistant coach with the Eagles.

Career statistics

Awards and honours

References

External links

1978 births
Living people
Austin Ice Bats players
Canadian expatriate ice hockey players in the United States
Canadian ice hockey defencemen
Colorado Eagles players
Grand Rapids Griffins players
Houston Aeros (1994–2013) players
New Mexico Scorpions (CHL) players
North Dakota Fighting Hawks men's ice hockey players
South Carolina Stingrays players
Ice hockey people from Calgary